Thijs van Pol (born 20 June 1991) is a Dutch footballer who plays as a forward for Belgian First Provincial club Berg en Dal.

Club career
He made his professional debut in the Eerste Divisie for FC Oss on 25 November 2016 in a game against Jong FC Utrecht.

In the summer of 2021, he joined Belgian First Provincial club Berg en Dal.

References

External links
 

1991 births
Sportspeople from Helmond
Footballers from North Brabant
Living people
Dutch footballers
Association football forwards
Helmond Sport players
FC Eindhoven players
TOP Oss players
Eerste Divisie players
Vierde Divisie players
Dutch expatriate footballers
Expatriate footballers in Belgium
Dutch expatriate sportspeople in Belgium